Numit Kappa is an ancient mythological epic literary work, written in Meitei language of Manipur. The work is believed to be written around or before 33 AD. 
The Epic is written in the form of partial poetry and partial prose.

The epic work is still considered to be the oldest known epic account in Meitei literature.

Etymology 

In Meitei language (officially called Manipuri), "Numit" means "the Sun" and "Kāppa" is derived from the root word "kāp" meaning "to shoot".

Synopsis 
In the epic, there are two Sun Gods, who brighten the world simultaneously. 
One was to be slain in order to create the night. 
The hero, Khwai Nungjeng Piba was an expert archer, who shot Taothuireng, one of the two Suns in the sky.

Two survived out of the five sons of the Celestial Goddess 
"O my Mother, O Mother of the Sun who is the Father of the world, O Mother of all the Gods. She who was the Mother of the World gave birth one day to three sons. The first-born son was destroyed like withered paddy, and became like old dry paddy, and entered into the earth, and became even as the ant heaps. Thereupon the Lairemma paddy and the great paddy were turned into Morasi and Iroya paddy. Her second-born son became rotten even as chicken's eggs, he became as the darkening rainbow. His eyes became like unto the eyes of a deer. Her third-born son was called Koide Ngamba, the younger brother of the Sun. He was of a haughty temper and quick in spirit. He fell into a fishing weir and was killed. Thereupon his teeth became like the teeth of a wild beast, his rib-bones became the long dao of the Gods. The hairs of his head became like the flowers that men offer to Pureiromba and all the other Gods. They became even as the flowers that men fasten on the ends of their spears to catch luangs (small hill fish) in December, or like to the flowers that the King's wives and children present to the fields, such flowers as the Angom Ningthou daily offers up, even as such became the white hairs of the God.

The exploitations of slave Khwai Nongjengba and his reactionary plots 
"Now the Sun and his brother Taohuirenga rose and set alternately. There was a man Khowai Nongjengba who had a slave, a lazy churl named Ekma Haodongla, who was wroth because the suns rose and set alternately. He said, 'I am a slave and twice have I to fetch wood, twice to bring in my master's paddy on my head. I cannot rear my children. I cannot see my wife. So he said to his wife, 'My dear, go, get a bamboo from your father.' But her father would not give her a bamboo. 'Go to your uncle and beg a bamboo from the Thongkhongkhural, a bamboo that grows on the Khural King's Sokpa Ching.' Thus he said, and sent her off. The Khural Lakpa gave him a bamboo from the hill. The slave of Khowai Nongjengba Piba in five days made a bow and arrows, and when he had dried them, he smeared the tips of the arrows with poison, and put the arrows in the quiver and rested. Then he said, 'Dear wife, Haonu Changkanu, my pretty one, go draw water and put the pot on your head. Then as his wife came from the water, he aimed and hit the pot on her head. One day he aimed and hit the hole in her ear. One day he aimed and hit a sparrow sitting on a heap of dhan. 'Wife, make food ready. A big boar has entered the field, a great python has come into the field. I will combat those strong things. I will kill that boar.' He slept by the side of the things he was going to take to the field, and for this reason the place is called "Thongyala Mamungshi".

Shooting of one of the two Suns and the hiding of the surviving Sun in a cave 
The Great Sun set at Loijing. His elder brother Taohuireng arose in his splendour, and Ekma Haodongla the slave of Khowai Nongjengba Piba, a lazy churl, drew the string to his cheek and though he fired the arrow carefully at the sun, he hit the sun's horse on the leg, and it fell near the great Maring village. When the bright sun fell by the arrow of the slave of Khowai Nongjengba Piba, he was afraid and hid himself in the earth in a great cave by the big village near the shrine of Pakhangba and Sanamahi. Then the Meitei land was dark by day and dark by night. The fields and the whole countryside looked to the Gods for pity because the day remained not. Weeds grew. Women that used to go to the fields went no more, women that used to toil in the fields went no more. The ten kings (Nongpok Ningthou, Chingkhai, Wangpulen, Khana Chaoba, Thangching, Sampurel, Loyalakpa, Koupalu, Kaoburel, Marjing), these ten gods knew not how to look for the place where the sun was. A woman going to the field was holding converse with a woman going to sow, 'My friend, my companion, what is that fire in the earth shining there over by the great village?' said she inquiring. 'Yes, my dear, the Sun is hiding near the shrine of God Pakhangba and Sanamahi.' 'It is the brightness of the Sun,' said the other as they talked. The ten Gods heard, and when they had returned to their own house, they called Thongnak, whose dreams were very true. Thongnak Lairemma, your dreams are very true, a dead person has entered into you. You do judgment on the dead. Call the Sun.' With these words they sent her.

Efforts of Goddess Thongak Lairembi to call the hiding Sun back 

Thongnak Lairemma called the Sun. 'O Sun, by reason of thy disappearance, the land of the Meiteis is in darkness day and night. Bring thy warmth over this land and over its villages.' Thus said she, and the Sun made answer to her. Yea, Thōngnāk Lairemma, formerly my Mother, who is Mother of all the Gods and the Mother of the world, gave birth to five sons. One day my eldest brother shrivelled up like dry paddy and was destroyed. My second brother became rotten like the eggs of a fowl, my brother Koidè Ngamba fell into a fishing weir and was drowned. Now my elder brother Taohuirengba has fallen by the arrow of the slave of Khowai Nongjengba Piba, for his horse was pierced through the leg by the arrow which he shot, and so he hides in a dark cave.' Thus he spake, and would not come forth. Thōngnāk Lairemma returned to her abode. Ye ten Gods, hear. The Sun cannot remain alone in the world.' Then the ten Gods hired Panthoibi, the daughter of the Meitei King, the wife of Khaba. O daughter of the King, who art beloved of the King of the country, who causest to be born all the souls of men and dost cause them to die, who art the Mother of the Gods and the Mother of all the country, thy face is beautiful, do thou go, do thou call thy Father the Sun.' When they said this, the King's dear daughter who causes a flower to bloom merely by touching a big white leaf, assented to their request. Ye Ten Gods, if ye bid me to persuade the bright Sun to come forth, make ready the roads, make men to go to and fro, build a machan five stories high, make the women all join in entreaties to him. In the baskets spread leaves carefully and set therein white rice, put eggs, fill the wine jars full of wine, wrap ginger in leaves and set it down, wrap cowries up in a black cloth and put them down near.' Then she took a white cock and all the other things and went to the broad country to persuade the bright Sun.

Request to the hiding Sun by Goddess Panthoibi 

"O Sun, by reason of your hiding, in the land of the Meiteis there is darkness night and day; by your brightness warm all the country to Imphal from here. Thus she said and thus she persuaded him, for he assented, and when the white fowl lifted up its foot on the earth, the Sun also raised his foot from the earth five times and climbed to the top of the machan. Then the ten Gods looked and saw that the sunshine was pale. Let us make this right,' they said. Then Pakhangba's priest sat on the right, and the priest of Thangjing, the God of Moirang, sat on the left. They took water from the river of Moirang, and an egg and yellow grass, and drew water from the top of Nongmaiching, and the priests, the children of the Gods, made the face of the Sun right, and his eyes and his face were bright and beautiful. Panthoibi holding the fowl soothed the Sun. Then the priest, who formerly guarded the seven branches of Nongmaiching, and who lived on that holy hill, whose name was Langmai Khoiri, who formerly worshipped the face of the sun, made prayers to the Sun. Thou hast come like the eyes of the hill. In the likeness of the eyes of the hill in thy brightness thou hast pitied us, the villages of Nongmaiching. Like the eyes of the Sun thou hast come. Like the eyes of the Sun by thy brightness the warmth of the sun has warmed all the ravines and jungle and all our villages on Nongmaiching.' Thus said he as he prayed.

Return of the Sun due to prayers 
The great village also made prayers to the Sun, and its priests sang and prayed. The women also of the great village have crossed the river and have gone to the fields. The Tangkhuls have taken up their daos. Men see their shadow in the water. By thy brightness all the paths and all the trees and all the bamboos in our great village are warm with the warmth of the sun.' Thus said he and prayed. Then the brothers, the cunning priests, slaves of Thangjing, prayed to the Sun God, 'O thou born on the stone, born on the white stone, who lightest the jungle, and the water, and who shinest up to the top of the loftiest bamboo, with thy brightness make warm the heat of the sun on the water of Moirang.' In the south the Khuman priest prayed. His father and his forefathers were very skilful, and his voice was very good, and his singing carried far. Than him there was none greater, his voice was like the cry of the crane, and in his singing there was no fault. Thus prayed he. 'O Sun, now that thou hast come, the trees, the bamboos, the grass, all are bright. O Sun by thy glorious brightness the leaves and the wood are as new, the heart is glad. By thy brightness make warm the heat of the sun upon the land of the Khumans. Then the priest of the King of Kangleipak, who was skilled in the songs of the Meiteis, whose voice was like the running water, invoked by name his deceased mother, and singing sweetly the name of his dead father, having sung the names of men that were dead and making them to unite in the history, he makes birds and crows that are dead to be among the Gods. He knows the souls of men and their names, even though they are lost, he knows them when they have become animals, though their names should be forgotten, he calls them in his song. Though hereafter the names of men be forgotten, he in his wisdom knows them, though they are wandering in the abyss among the demons, even though they have joined themselves unto swine, he knows them. Thus made he prayer. 'O Sun, Thou alone art beautiful, thou art the Father of all the unfortunate, thou art deathless, there is none like thee for truth and beauty. I cannot tell all thy names in my song, so many are they. Thou art the source of all good fortune, for in the scent of the earth is seen the warmth of the sun. O Bright Sun, thou art the source and the strength of all the world and of immortality.'

In Meitei religion 
 The archaic terms in Meitei language is still chanted by the priestesses during Chupsaba ceremony (a ritual associated with the special kind of death in Meitei cosmology), in the form of hymns.

English translation 
 The first English translation of the epic poetry was published in the book The Meitheis, written by T.C. Hodson in the year 1908.

In popular culture 
 Recently, the epic is reenacted in the form of play, at Delhi based National Institute of Performing Arts (NIPA) under the directions of Sarungbam Biren.

Comparative myths 

 Chinese mythology - Archer Hou Yi shooting the 9 out of 10 suns
 Japanese mythology - Solar deity Amaterasu hiding inside the Amano-Iwato cave

See also 
 Binary star -  a system of two stars
 Khamba Thoibi - another epic of Meitei literature
 List of epics in Meitei language

Further reading
 Language, Literature and National Integration
 Manipur, Past and Present: Nagas & Kuki-Chins

Bibliography
 Numit Kappa
 The Meitheis

Sources

References

External links 

Indian literature
Meitei folklore
Meitei literature
Meitei mythology
Meitei script
Puyas